Priyanka is a popular female given name in Hindu and Buddhist cultures. It is a name derived from the Sanskrit word 'Priyankera' or 'Priyankara', meaning someone or something that is amiable, lovable, or makes you happy and the one who has lovely eyes (priya ank). In its adverb form it can also mean endearing behavior, for example an act of showing kindness or happiness or excitement; or kind agree-ability. 

The Sanskrit word Priyankara is also used to describe the white variety of the 'Kantakari' flower (Sweta kantakari). Some of the earliest mentions of the Kantakari flower can be found in the ancient Hindu Ayurveda text from the mid-second millennium BCE.

People
Priyanka (drag queen), winner of season 1 of Canada's Drag Race
Priyanka Arul Mohan (born 1994), Indian actress
Priyanka Bassi, Indian television actress

Priyanka Chaturvedi (born 1979), Spokesperson of All India Congress Committee
Priyanka Chhabra (born 1994), Indian actress and model
Priyanka Chopra (born 1982), Indian actress, singer and Miss World 2000
Priyanka Choudhary (born 1996), Indian actress and model
Priyanka Dutt (born 1984), Indian film producer
Priyanka Gandhi, (born 1972) Indian politician
Priyanka Jawalkar, (born 1992) Indian actress
Priyanka Karki, Nepalese actress
Priyanka Kothari (born 1983), Bollywood actress
Priyanka Nair (born 1985), Malayalam actress
Priyanka Nalkari (born 1994), Indian film and television actress
Priyanka Sarkar, Bengali film and television actress
Priyanka Shah, Indian actress
Priyanka Singh Rawat, politician from Bhartiya Janata Party
Priyanka Upendra, Indian actress also known as Priyanka Trivedi
Priyanka Xi (born 1991), New Zealand actress
Priyanka Yoshikawa, Miss Japan, 2016

Other uses
Priyanka (1994 film), 1994 Tamil drama film 
Priyanka (2016 film), 2016 Kannada drama film

See also

References 

Indian feminine given names